Remoulins is a commune in the Gard department in southern France.

The town lies on the River Gardon or Gard, and is a short distance downstream of the Roman aqueduct Pont du Gard, in nearby Vers-Pont-du-Gard.

The current bridge over the Gardon in the town itself was completed in 1994, the successor to two previous suspension bridges. The remains of the first, built in 1830 by the Seguin brothers, are visible on the left bank.

Population

Transport
Remoulins has a train station. However, no passenger trains are currently scheduled to stop there.

See also
Communes of the Gard department

References

External links

 Pictures of Remoulins
 Pictures of the remains of a suspension bridge

Communes of Gard